British Columbia Archaeological Assessment Process:
British Columbia has set forth a directive process in order to regulate the development of land by private and government identities, this is known as the Heritage Act. British Columbia holds cultural sites throughout its geography and is home to many famous aboriginal archaeological sites, such as the
Kwäday Dän Ts'ìnchi, which was an archaeological site containing a frozen person in British Columbia's Tatshenshini-Alsek Park. British Columbia archaeological sites are held in accordance with both the Heritage Act and the federal Environmental Assessment Act, which regulates the areas where developers can utilize and where the provincial government can build infrastructure. This process has not been put into place to discourage development, but has been put into place to regulate historic cultural sites in order to retain historic areas, sites, ecofacts, and artefacts.

Procedures
When applying for permits and assessments in regards to British Columbia development projects, there is an intense procedure that has to be followed, which contains many important steps and approvals. Upon receipt of an application in reference to a project report in regards to the Environmental Assessment Act, the following stages will occur:

When in receipt of a development referral, the following procedure will be undertaken by the British Columbia,  Archaeological Assessment office,  in accordance with the Heritage Act  and the Environmental Assessment Act:

Heritage Conservation Act
The British Columbia Heritage Conservation Act has been put into place in order to protect provincial heritage sites, objects, and other heritage property determined suitable by the Provincial Government of British Columbia. In a simpler sense, this act has been put in place to record and maintain historic buildings in British Columbia that hold significant importance to the history and culture of British Columbia, for both aboriginal and non-aboriginal lineage. First Nations of  British Columbia have the ability to make an agreement with the Provincial Government under this act to protect what they may classify as a cultural or heritage site, these applications by First Nations must be approved by the Lieutenant Governor in Council of British Columbia. If there is another provincial act that conflicts with the interests of this act, in regards to heritage sites within British Columbia this Heritage Conservation Act will prevail. With the consent of the Lieutenant Governor in Council the minister may establish and distinguish heritage classifications and policies in accordance with heritage sites and object(s) managed by the government. The Heritage Conservation Act of British Columbia can delegate essentially what qualifies as historical and can claim any unclaimed historical and/or cultural property and call it as its own. The result of the object or site, can end up in a museum or as a preserved site by the Provincial Government of British Columbia. Essentially this act would provide certainty to the preservation of archaeological artefacts and would protect the area, along with the excavated arte/ecofacts found during an archaeological excavation, a development, and/or a discovery.

Environmental Assessment Act

The Environmental Assessment Act is enforced by the provincial government of British Columbia and by the British Columbia Environmental Assessment Office. Under this act, the proposed development is not to occur or progress until an environmental certificate is authorized by the Environmental Assessment Office, when classified as a "reviewable project".  If a project is designated to occur on treaty land, even with the authority of the Environmental Assessment Office no development is to occur until consent is given by the treaty First Nations band, and if authorization is not granted, the project will be stopped from operating on said treaty land. When determining a need for an environmental assessment certificate, the executive director may determine that the project may proceed without an assessment certificate, in the conditions that no adverse environmental, social, or cultural damage would occur.  The executive director can also call for the need of an environmental assessment if he or she determines that there would be adverse effects on cultural, social, or other significant environmental factors. The executive director essentially has a lot of control under the determination of environmental assessments, including determining the hazard ratio of reviewable projects under his or her expertise.  The executive director also would advise the proponent of their decision and for required documentation for him or her to make their final decision. All environmental assessment agreements with the federal or other provincial governments will be made through the provincial minister of British Columbia and can be approved or denied by the minister.  With written notice by the minister, any individual holding consent of the minister may enter a reviewable site and inspect it as guided by the sanctions of the provincial Environmental Assessment Act.  If a proponent begins with the operation of their project, the Environmental Assessment Act along with the Environmental Assessment Office has the authority to dismantle, modify, or cease the continuance of this project, as set forth by the laws included with this assessment act. If a said project goes forward without the consent of the Environmental Assessment Office, the minister may apply to the Supreme court to enforce the decision of the Environmental Assessment Office in accordance with the Environmental Assessment Act.  If the proponent does not cease their acts that are not in compliance with rule 41, they may be liable to pay $100,000 on their first offence, $200,000 on their subsequent offences if a corporation, $100,000 (plus 6 months of jail time)/$200,000 (plus 12 months of jail time) for subsequent offences for individuals.

Kwäday Dän Ts'ìnchi Project
The Kwäday Dän Ts'ìnchi or in translation "long ago person found" is an archaeological excavation that has occurred in the Tatshenshini-Alsek Park, which is part of the Champagne and Aishihik First Nations (CAFN), this person was found by hunters in 1999. This project holds a significant tie to the British Columbia Archaeological Assessment office due to their involvement in organizing the excavation team and their involvement in assuring the proper recovery of this body. The body that was recovered by archaeologists was radiocarbon dated back roughly 550 years ago, predating the voyage of Christopher Columbus to the New World, and dating to approximately 300 years before the arrival of Europeans on the Northwest Coast. The Kwäday Dän Ts'ìnchi was found with his possession, which included a robe made of 95 animals skins, a spear thrower, an iron-blade knife, a sinew, along with a walking stick.  With cooperation of the First Nations community of this area and a team of forensic anthropologists, the Kwäday Dän Ts'ìnchi was said to have died on a glacier, which quickly incorporated and preserved his body, where he would lie for hundreds of years, until several hunters would discover his remains. This lost hunter would become the study of museums, experts, and locals for decades to come, the assessment process for this archaeological excavation was also very analytic and detailed, due to this individual being the oldest person found in North American history.

References

External links
 Forests, Lands and Natural Resource Operations- Office in control of Archaeological Assessments in British Columbia.
 Provincial Heritage Act- Government of British Columbia
 Provincial Environmental Assessment Act- Government of British Columbia
 Kwäday Dän Ts'ìnchi Project- Ministry of Forests, Lands, and Natural Resource Operations

Archaeology of Canada
Nature conservation in Canada
Cultural heritage of Canada
Pacific Northwest Coast Archaeology
Natural history of British Columbia